The Academy Vivarium Novum (or Accademia in Italian) in Rome is the only college in the world where students can spend one or more years immersed in Latin and Ancient Greek. These languages are spoken both in and outside of the classroom. The academy is directed by Luigi Miraglia, who according to the New Yorker magazine "speaks Latin more fluently than almost anyone else alive".

The Academy Vivarium Novum was founded with the intent to preserve the tradition of Renaissance schools, their teaching methods, and the vision of the world that such an education fosters. It wants to induce a rebirth of the humanities based on the belief that dignity (dignitas hominis) may be attained only by continuous self-examination. The students of the Academy Vivarium Novum aim to achieve a comprehensive grasp of the Latin and Ancient Greek languages.

The name Vivarium Novum recalls the proto-humanistic community of Cassiodorus, Theodoric's magister officiorum. Vivarium was a place where liberal arts and lofty aspiration coincided; at the same time it evokes the isle of Vivara located in the Bay of Naples, where the idea of a school prepared to offer an advanced education to future generations was first conceived.

Academic year 
The main programme offered by the Academy, which is held from the beginning of October up to the end of June, mainly aims to provide male students with a strong experience in the domain of the Humanities. The subjects of the courses are principally Ancient Greek philosophy, Latin literature, Renaissance literature, Ancient Greek language and literature and Roman History. The course of History of poetry and ancient prosody combines ancient verses with music, in order to explain their metrical structure in a more efficient way. The choir of the Academy, Tyrtarion (from the names of Tyrtaeus and Arion), has already become well known in the domain of Latin and Greek poetry.
Despite the curriculum being taught in classical languages, the programme's aim is not the mastery of the Latin and ancient Greek languages for their own sake. Rather, these languages are thought of as instrumental in understanding the most significant aspects of the western world's literary, philosophical, and historical legacy, and how it has been shaped by them.
Pupils from sixteen to twenty-five years of age are admitted to the Academy; every year, an application process is organised in order to receive scholarships and be admitted to the Academy for one year. Room, board, classes and didactic materials are all provided free to recipients.

Summer course 
In order to fund these scholarships and to foster effective methods of teaching Latin and Greek, the Academy and the Mnemosyne Foundation organise each year an intensive Summer Course of Latin. This course lasts exactly eight weeks, from the end of June to the middle of August, and aims to bring students to the easy reading of the classics without any previous knowledge. The course is divided into two modules of four weeks, and is open to everyone.

Publishing house 
In order to achieve the best and fastest results in teaching Latin and Greek, the Academy has developed a new methodology which is today considered among the most effective in the world. The Academy is considered one of the main promoters of the so-called direct method for the teaching of ancient languages, which is based on the textbook Lingua Latina per se illustrata, of the Danish author Hans Ørberg, and on an adaptation and extension, for Ancient Greek, of the English book Athenaze. Both are published and distributed in Italy by the Academy, and have been adopted in many schools all around the world. Notably, the publishing and distribution of these books is entirely non-profit, with all profits providing scholarships to worthy male students.

Tyrtarion 
Tyrtarion, or the Tyrtarion choir, is the band and choir of the school Accademia Vivarium Novum. Led by Eusebius Aron Tóth, the Tyrtarion choir aims to illustrate and preserve ancient poetry, literature, and music. The choir is known for its restoration of Latin and Ancient Greek poetry. The name Tyrtarion was established in 2010 by joining the names of the poets Tyrtaeus and Arion.

Tyrtarion performs classical, baroque, and Renaissance music. Usually, they perform the works and poems of  ancient Roman and Greek poets such as Homer, Gills Orphicae, Lucretius, Carmen, Virgil, Horace, and Pliny.

The musicians and singers of the band and choir are made up of the students from Accademia Vivarium Novum. The most notable people of the crew include: Eusebius Aron Tóth, founder; Alexander Feye, composer and violinist; Philippus Marins, composer and guitarist; and Georgius Shakhov, composer, singer, and drummer.

Videos

See also
Contemporary Latin

References

Classical educational institutes 
Latin-language education
Ancient Greek-language education